Campbell's Bay is a municipality in Pontiac Regional County Municipality in western Quebec, Canada. Its population in 2021 was 705.

It is the county seat and is home to most government offices for the county, including the Sûreté du Québec, and has French and English elementary schools. Campbell's Bay is in the heart of the Pontiac, as it is situated between Shawville and Fort-Coulonge. It also lies completely enclosed by the municipality of Litchfield on all sides, with the exception of the Ottawa River to the west.

Campbell's Bay is the seat of the judicial district of Pontiac.

History 
In 1851, Lieutenant Donald Campbell, a member of the Scottish Regiment, received a large tract of land along a bay of the Ottawa River (now known as Lac à Campbell), which was named after him. He settled there and operated a sawmill. In 1888, the Campbell's Bay Post Office opened and in 1904, the village municipality was formed when it separated from Litchfield.

A hanging took place in 1935 in Campbell's Bay Court Yard. Michael Bradley  was convicted for the murder of five family members. He was the last person to be hanged in Campbell's Bay.

In 2003, it changed status from Village Municipality to (regular) Municipality.

Demographics

Government
The town government comprises a mayor and 6 councilors.

Current council:
 Mayor: Maurice Beauregard 
 Councillors: Raymond Pilon, Tim Ferrigan, Maurice Beauregard, Lisa Dagenais, Lois Smith and Suzanne Dubeau-Pilon

List of former mayors:

 Cletus Ferrigan (2002–2005)
 Jean-Louis Auger (2005–2009)
 William Stewart (2009–2017)
 Maurice Beauregard (2017–present)

Town festivals
FallFest at the Church of Faith, Praise and Prayer
Bikes in the Bay - weekend of motorcycle events, music, food and kids' activities on June 12, 13 & 14, 2009 visit www.bikesinthebay.com for more info

Transportation

Quebec Route 148 and Quebec Route 301 (rue Leslie) are the main roads that connect into and out of Campbell's Bay. Front Street (rue Front) is the longest and main road within town.

There are no railway stations or airports within or near Campbell's Bay. The nearest major airport is Ottawa International Airport.

See also
 List of municipalities in Quebec

References

External links

 Elections Canada Results - 39th General Election (2006)
 Director General of Quebec Elections
 Official Transport Quebec Road Map

Incorporated places in Outaouais
Municipalities in Quebec
Populated places established in 1904
1904 establishments in Quebec